Traill Island is a large island in eastern Greenland. It is named after zoologist Thomas Stewart Traill.  The island is a part of the Northeast Greenland National Park.

Geography
Traill Island is a coastal island located in the desolate region of Eastern Greenland on the eastern side of King Oscar Fjord, northeast of Davy Sound. Geographical Society Island lies to the north, separated by a narrow channel, the Vega Sound. 

The southernmost point of the island is Cape Simpson. Dream Bay (Drømmebugten) is located  WNW of the headland and larger Mountnorris Fjord to the northeast. 

See also
List of islands of Greenland
List of Ultras of Greenland

References

External links

Uninhabited islands of Greenland
Islands of Greenland